Identity Crisis is a seven-issue comic book limited series published by DC Comics from June to December in 2004. It was created by writer Brad Meltzer and the artistic team of penciler Rags Morales and inker Michael Bair.

Publication history
One of DC's top-selling series, the first issue was released in June 2004 and was ranked first in comic book sales for that period with pre-order sales of 163,111. The second issue saw a decline in sales and ranked third in comic book sales in July period with pre-order sales of 129,852. The story also adheres to the continuity changes introduced by Crisis on Infinite Earths and Zero Hour: Crisis in Time!, as heroine Wonder Woman was retconned out of the pre-Crisis JLA. In all further references to the JLA's pre-Crisis adventures, including its origin story and the Secret Society incident, Wonder Woman is replaced by Black Canary. Following Infinite Crisis, however, Wonder Woman is restored as a founding member.

One of the major plot threads — the breakdown of relationships within the Justice League of America — is examined in the storyline "Crisis of Conscience" in JLA #115-119 (August–December 2005). The mini-series is followed by the crossover event Infinite Crisis.

Plot summary
While Elongated Man is on a stakeout, during which a minor villain called Bolt is shot and wounded by criminals, his wife Sue Dibny is murdered in their apartment, apparently dying of burns. The DC superhero community rallies to find the murderer, with recurring villain Doctor Light being the prime suspect. Green Arrow reveals to the Flash (Wally West) and Green Lantern (Kyle Rayner) that Light once raped Sue Dibny in the JLA satellite headquarters. To ensure this could not happen again to Sue, another Justice League member or their loved ones, the members at that time — Atom (Ray Palmer), Black Canary, Hawkman, Green Lantern (Hal Jordan), and a very reluctant Flash (Barry Allen) — voted to allow the sorceress Zatanna to mind-wipe the villain and alter his personality to an ineffectual buffoon before again sending him to prison.

Further discussion reveals that a mind wipe was also done on at least one other occasion: when the Secret Society of Super Villains (the Wizard, Floronic Man, Star Sapphire, Reverse-Flash, and Blockbuster) captures JLA members Superman, Batman, Flash, Green Lantern (Hal Jordan), Zatanna and Black Canary (Wonder Woman in the pre-Crisis continuity) and switched bodies with the heroes, allowing the villains to learn their secret identities by casually removing the heroes' masks. Although the heroes defeated the villains, Zatanna once again erased the villains' memories of the incident and their knowledge of the secret identities. Green Arrow's words also imply that they have done this on other occasions when their secret identities were threatened by magic or other means.

The heroes locate Light, who has hired the mercenary Deathstroke to protect him. During the ensuing battle, Light regains his memory and, enraged by the violation, uses his formerly lost powers to escape. Although questioned by Superman, Wally West continues to protect the heroes and their secrets, but Superman has learned them after eavesdropping on the conversations between him and Green Arrow with his enhanced hearing. Atom finds his estranged ex-wife, Jean Loring, hanging from a door, blindfolded and gagged, and revives her just in time, but she is unable to describe her attacker. A death threat is then sent to Superman's wife, Lois Lane. Captain Boomerang (Digger Harkness) is hired by third-rate villain the Calculator (on behalf of the real killer) to assassinate Jack Drake, father of Robin, Tim Drake. Jack finds a gun and a note warning him of the impending attempt on his life, and fatally shoots Boomerang who also kills him. Tim Drake comes upon the aftermath of this and is comforted by partner Batman, who confiscates the note before the authorities or the media can learn of its existence.

During questioning of several villains by the heroes, former League member Firestorm (Ronnie Raymond) is stabbed through the chest with the sword of the Shining Knight by the villain the Shadow Thief. Firestorm's nuclear powers reach critical mass and he detonates in the atmosphere.

Wally West questions Green Arrow again after accidentally seeing a snapshot of the battle on the Satellite in Light's mind, which reveals that Batman was also present. Green Arrow confesses that Batman had left immediately after the battle, but unexpectedly returned just as the mind wipe was taking place. He disapproved of this and nearly attacked the other heroes; he was magically restrained and his memory of the incident was removed. Batman locates the Calculator's hideout, but discovers the villain anticipated this and abandoned it. The autopsy of Sue Dibny's body by Doctor Mid-Nite and Mister Terrific, members of the Justice Society, reveals Dibny was killed by an infarction in her brain. A microscopic scan of Dibny's brain reveals tiny footprints as a clue to the infarction's cause.

Doctor Mid-Nite and Mister Terrific realize, as does Batman in the course of his own investigation, that Dibny was murdered by someone who has access to Ray Palmer's technology, which as the Atom, he uses to shrink himself to subatomic size. Almost simultaneously, Palmer learns that Jean is aware of the note sent to Jack Drake (which had been kept secret) and realizes she is the killer. Loring claims she did not mean to kill Sue, and it was not her intention for Jack Drake to be killed, arguing that she sent the note and gun so he could protect himself. Loring states that she undertook the plan (including faking the attempt on her own life) in order to bring Ray back into her life. Realizing that Loring is insane, he has her committed to Arkham Asylum before being wracked by guilt over his former wife's actions then disappeared. In the final scene with the Justice League, Wally West is awkward in the presence of Batman, who is suspicious of his behavior.

Aftermath
The ramifications of Identity Crisis are depicted in the title Flash, as his Rogues Gallery villains band together at the funeral of Boomerang; the one-shot Countdown to Infinite Crisis, as well as one of its tie-ins, The OMAC Project; and the title JLA, which reveals that Batman remembered the events in question at some point afterwards, which retroactively explains his paranoia against both heroes and villains over the years that led him to create the contingencies against them as revealed in the storyline JLA: Tower of Babel. Batman's suspicions of his fellow heroes' conduct lead him to create the Brother MK I satellite to monitor superhumans, which is an important factor in the 2005–2006 crossover storyline Infinite Crisis. It is revealed in that storyline that the Justice League's mind manipulation, Jean Loring's turn to villainy, and Sue Dibny's rape by Dr. Light were three of the many indirect changes effected by Alexander Luthor Jr. and Superboy-Prime when they caused overlaps of parallel timelines (Hypertime) from their pocket universe since after the events of Crisis on Infinite Earths.

Awards
The miniseries was selected by the Young Adult Library Services Association (YALSA)'s 2007 recommended list of Great Graphic Novels for Teens.

Reception 
The overall crossover holds an average score of 7.3 out of 10 at the review aggregator website Comic Book Roundup, the lowest issue score going to issue 7, with 5.3, and the highest going to issue 1, with 8.7.

Chris Sims of Comics Alliance called the series "the comic that ruined comics". Sims' colleague, Matt D. Wilson, did not concur with that exact assessment, but felt that the miniseries did a disservice to its protagonists: "Virtually every hero comes out of Identity Crisis looking like a jerk, a victim or a pariah". Wilson also stated that the series was "a destructive comic", as it had a negative influence on subsequent comics, such as Marvel’s 2006-2007 miniseries Civil War, which similarly depicted heroes in what Wilson thought was a questionable light.

Greg Burgas of Comic Book Resources called the miniseries a "work of staggering genius". Burgas felt that the first six issues were interesting and bore great potential, but the story was not a good murder mystery, as it was ruined by the abrupt revelation of Jean Loring's guilt, which did not naturally follow the establishing of any evidence pointing to her throughout the course of the story, and that both her motive and the aftermath of her confession were implausible. Burgas also felt that Sue Dibney's rape was cheapened by the fact that Meltzer used it not to deal with how Sue dealt with the trauma, but how it affected her mostly male friends. Burgas also questioned Meltzer's stated motive of using the mindwipe to addressing the "goofiness" with which Dr. Light behaved in the comics that Meltzer read as a child, as Burgas felt that children's literature is often intended to convey such a tone, and does not require updating. Burgas also felt that by using established superheroes in a story intended to comment on the nature of heroism, Meltzer and DC did profound damage with their treatment of those characters, whose behavior in the story was decidedly not heroic.

Dominic Organ, writing for Comics Bulletin, was critical of the series' artwork, stating it was "incredibly spotty in places", inconsistent and "at times it is downright ugly". Organ, however, was impressed with some of Morales work, in particular the panel of Batman racing back to Tim's apartment, which prompted Organ to note: "The fear is palpable and all over Batman's face, a single panel that will stick with me for some time I am sure". Organ also praised the story, claiming that the stand-out was "the human tragedy of it all".

In 2009, Comics Alliance named it one of the 15 Worst Comics of the Decade, stating it was "the embodiment of all the worst aspects of current super-hero comics".

Collected editions
DC Comics reprinted the Identity Crisis mini-series in April 2005 with recolored covers. A hardcover collection was printed in September 2005, with bonus features including a commentary by Meltzer and Morales; the creative team citing favorite moments, and a look at Morales' sketchbook.

A paperback collection was released on August 16, 2006. The paperback collection ranked third in the top 100 graphic novels for the August 2006 period with pre-order sales of 7746.

An Absolute Edition of Identity Crisis was released on October 12, 2011.

See also
 Heroes in Crisis

References

External links
Interview with Meltzer on The Sound of Young America
Crisis Team: Meltzer, Morales look back at "Identity Crisis", Comic Book Resources. October 6, 2005

2004 comics debuts
2004 comics endings
Mystery comics
Comics by Brad Meltzer
Crime comics
Justice League storylines